Bidaczów may refer to the following places in Poland:

Nowy Bidaczów
Stary Bidaczów